Labyrinth der Sinne is the second full-length studio album by German industrial rock/medieval metal band Tanzwut. It was released in 2000 by EMI Music. The album ranked #46 on the German Alternative Charts (DAC) Top Albums of 2000.

Track listing
 "Tanzwut" − 3:52
 "Ekstase" − 3:39
 "Lügner" − 4:37
 "Bitte bitte" − 3:13 (Music and lyrics composed and written by  Farin Urlaub; Die Ärzte cover)
 "Labyrinth" − 3:07
 "Niemals ohne dich" − 4:10
 "Die Drohne" − 3:36
 "Der Wächter" − 3:19 (Music and lyrics composed and written by Voyce)
 "Dämmerung" − 3:32
 "Was soll der Teufel im Paradies" − 4:10
 "Gigolo" − 3:10
 "Ikarus" − 3:59
 "Götterfunken" − 5:50 (Producers: Ritchie Barton, Uwe Hassbecker)(Lyrics written by Johann Wolfgang von Goethe)(Original music composed by Ludwig van Beethoven)

Credits

Band members
 Teufel − vocals
 Koll A. − bagpipes, flute (shawm)
 Castus − backing vocals, violin (hurdy-gurdy), bagpipes, flute (shawm)
 Wim − bagpipes, flute (shawm)
 Brandan − bass, bagpipes

Production
 All tracks produced and engineered at Thommy Hein Tonstudios, except track 13 produced and mixed at Danzmusik Studio (Berlin, Germany).
 Arranged by Ritchie Barton, Uwe Hassbecker
 Assistant engineer Sven Friedrich: (tracks: 1 to 12)
 Producer, engineer: Thommy Hein (tracks: 1 to 12)
 Music and lyrics composed and written by Themann (tracks: 2, 3, 5, 6, 9, 10) and Tyrus (tracks: 3, 5, 6, 9, 10)

References

2000 albums
Tanzwut albums